BNS Darshak  is a hydrographic survey ship of the Bangladesh Navy. She was commissioned on 5 November 2020.

See also
 BNS Tallashi
 Khulna Shipyard Limited
 List of active ships of the Bangladesh Navy

References

Ships of the Bangladesh Navy
Research vessels of Bangladesh
2020 ships